Wumengosaurus is an extinct aquatic reptile from the Middle Triassic (late Anisian stage) Guanling Formation of Guizhou, southwestern China. It was originally described as a basal eosauropterygian and usually is recovered as such by phylogenetic analyses, although one phylogeny has placed it as the sister taxon to Ichthyosauromorpha while refraining from a formal re-positioning.

In 2021, Qin et al. described an additional specimen from Guizhou (Panzhou District) as a new species of Wumengosaurus, W. rotundicarpus.

Classification
In the 2023 description of Luopingosaurus, Xu et al. recovered Wumengosaurus as a derived pachypleurosaurid, as the sister taxon to the clade formed by Luopingosaurus and Honghesaurus. The results of their phylogenetic analyses are shown in the cladogram below:

References

Fossil taxa described in 2008
Monotypic prehistoric reptile genera
Sauropterygian genera
Middle Triassic reptiles of Asia
Reptiles of China
Aquatic reptiles
Anisian life
Anisian genus first appearances
Guanling Formation